Perry Ronquillo (born 1965) is a former award-winning PBA coach.  He is currently a school teacher in the United States.

Playing career 
He played for De La Salle Green Archers under head coach Derrick Pumaren, and won 2 UAAP championships together with PBA future stars Jun Limpot, Dindo Pumaren, future Benilde coach Dong Vergeire, Joey Santamaria, Terrafirma Dyip coach Johnedel Cardel, Tim Cone's brother-in-law Eddie Villaplana and future PBA assistant coach Richard del Rosario.

Coaching career 
He led Formula Shell Turbo Chargers to victory becoming the only coach to successively win Coach of the year award. and the Baby Dalupan Trophy in 1998 and 1999. He took over as head coach when the former left in 1997. Perry formerly worked as a cash office retail  specialist in California.

References

Living people
1965 births
Filipino men's basketball coaches
Shell Turbo Chargers coaches
Shell Turbo Chargers

Philippines men's national basketball team players
Filipino men's basketball players

Philippines men's national basketball team coaches